Codrington Wind Farm is a wind farm near Yambuk on the coast of south-western Victoria, Australia.
Completed in June 2001, the 18.2MW installation of 14 wind turbines generates 51 GWh annually, for a capital cost of A$30 million by
Pacific Hydro being the first fully private investment in a wind farm in Australia. When opened it was Australia's largest wind farm and the first in Victoria.

The Yambuk wind farm (Part of the Portland Wind Farm project) is directly adjacent to the Codrington Wind Farm. It has a total of 30MW in its 20 turbines.

See also

 Portland Wind Farm
 Wind power in Australia

External links
Pacific Hydro page on Codrington Wind Farm
Clean Energy Council

Wind farms in Victoria (Australia)